In art history, an anonymous master is an Old Master whose work is known, but whose name is lost.

Renaissance
Only in the Renaissance did individual artists in Western Europe acquire personalities known by their peers (some listed by Vasari in his Lives of the Artists), such as those known by:
 Their true name or their father's name:
 Filippino Lippi after his father Fra Filippo Lippi
 A chosen pseudonym, possibly linked to his birthplace or his father's trade:
 Giuliano da Sangallo worked on the gate of Saint Gall
 Antonio del Pollaiuolo, after his father, a chicken farmer (pollo in Italian)
 Jacopo del Sellaio, after his father, a saddler (sellier)
 The Della Robbias (after the Tuscan word robbia, dyers' madder, and his father, the dyer Luca della Robbia)
 Masuccio Segondo, student of Masuccio Primo
 etc.
 A surname attributed to him:
 Il Cronaca, who never stopped talking about the ruins he had seen in Rome
 Daniele da Volterra, nicknamed  Il Braghettone (the breeches maker) for having censored nudes in paintings by adding cloths or branches, at the request of Pope Paul IV
 Luca della Robbia, for the madder colour he used as a ceramicist
 Masaccio, known as the idiot
 etc.
 A corporation, whose generic name is given to works made by all its members:
 the Campionesi Masters, sculptors and builders of religious buildings (Ugo da Campione, Bonino da Campione, Giovanni da Campione, Zenone de Campione, Matteo da Campione)

20th-century problems of attribution
The idea of a named and recognised painter originated among art historians early in the 20th century, who were attributing works they recognised to known painters. They later went back on some of these attributions, renaming as anonymous the painters they had formerly named. One example is the case of Pier Francesco Fiorentino, to whom Bernard Berenson attributed a number of works which were later re-attributed to Pseudo Pier Francesco Fiorentino, a Florence copyist. Some painters have even been described as anonymous (even many times like Barthélemy Eyck) before later being recognised. They thus held several names historically (those who are noted on the page devoted to them), although doubts continue surrounding some, such as Giovanni Gaddi (after 1333 – 1383) maybe the Master of the Misericordia dell’Accademia.

Artists

Dates
 Master of 1302
 Master of 1310
 Master of 1328
 Master of 1342
 Master of 1499
 Master of the 1540s

A
 Master of Alkmaar
 Master of Ambrass
 Master of Amiens
 Master of the Antiphonal Q of San Giorgio Maggiore
 Master of Antoine de Bourgogne
 Master of Arguis
 Master of Ávila
 Master of the Altarpiece of the Ten Commandments
 Master of the Aquisgrana Altarpiece
 Master of the Annunciation to the Shepherds
 Master of Astorga
 Master of the Assisi Choirbooks

B
 Master of Badia a Isola
 Master of the Bamberg Altar
 Master of the Bardi Saint Francis
 Becerril Master
 Bedford Master
 Master of the Beighem Altarpiece
 Master of the Berswordt Altar
 First Master of the Bible Historiale of Jean de Berry
 Bigallo Master
 Master of the Blue Crucifixes
 Master of the Brunswick Diptych
 Brunswick Monogrammist
 Master of the Brussels Initials
 Byzantine Master of the Crucifix of Pisa
 Master of the Bützow Altarpiece

C

 City of Ladies Master and his studio of illuminators of The Book of the City of Ladies by Christine de Pisan
 Master of Cabestany
 Master of the Cappella di San Nicola
 Master of the Cappella Medici Polyptych
 Master of the Cassone degli Adimari, probably Lo Scheggia, brother of Masaccio
 Master of the Cassoni Campana, builder of cassone
 Master of Crea
 Campionesi Masters
 Master of Castelsardo
 Master of Castelseprio, fresco painter at Santa Maria Foris Portas at Castelseprio, in the province of Varese.
 Master of the Castello della Manta
 Chief Associate of the Bedford Master

D
 Dipylon Master
 Master of the Darmstädter Passion
 Master of the Darup Altarpiece
 Master of Delft
 Masters of Dirc van Delf
 Master of the Death of the Virgin (engraver)
 Master of the Death of the Virgin (painter)
 Master of the Drapery Studies (also known as Master of the Coburg Roundels)

E
 Elmelunde Master
 Master of the Embroidered Foliage
 Master E. S.
 Expressionist Master of Santa Chiara

F
 Master of the Female Half-Lengths
 Master of the Franciscan Crucifixions (13th century)
 Master of Frankfurt
 Master of the Fresco of the Twelve Moons, north Italy, painter of a secular fresco of the late 14th century (1391–1407) at Trente, in a room of the Tower of Eagles of the Castello del Buonconsiglio.
 Master of the Friedberg Altarpiece
 Master of the Fröndenberger Altarpiece
 Master of the Furies

G
 Master of the Gardens of Love
 Master of the Gardner Annunciation
 Master of the Gerona Martyrology
 Master of the Golden Altar
 Master of the Graudenz Altarpiece
 Master of the Greenville Tondo
 Master of the Grigg Crucifixion
 Master of the Gubbio Cross

H
 Master of the Hallein Altar
 Master of Heiligenkreuz
 Master of the Heisterbach Altarpiece
 Master of the High Altar of Szmrecsány
 Master of Hohenfurth, an alternate name for the Master of Vyšší Brod
 Master of the Housebook

I
 Master I. A. M. of Zwolle
 Illustratore
 Master of the Imhoff Altar
 Isaac Master
 Master of the Iserlohn Altarpiece

J
 Master of James IV of Scotland
 Master of Jannecke Bollengier
 Master of Jánosrét

K
 Kirchdorf Master
 Master of the Karlsruhe Passion
 Master of the Khanenko Adoration

L

 Master of the Legend of the Magdalen
 Master of the (Bruges) legend of St. Ursula, Flemish, 15th century
 Master of the Legend of Saint Lucy
 Master of the Legend of the Holy Mother
 Master of the Libro di casa
 Master of the Lippborg Passion
 Master of the Litoměřice Altarpiece
 Master of the Llangattock Epiphany
 Master of the Llangattock Hours
 Master of the Lübeck Bible
 Master of the Ludlow Annunciation

M
 Master of the Malchin Altar
 Master of Magione
 Master of the Marble Madonnas
 Master of Meßkirch
 Master of the Mesi
 Master of the Mornauer Portrait

N
 Master of the Louvre Nativity, probably Fra Diamante (according to Bernard Berenson)
 Naumburg Master, mid-13th-century sculptor
 Master of Nördlingen
 Northern Master

O
 Master of the Osservanza, Sienna school, 15th century
 Oltremontano Master
 Master of the Ortenberg Altarpiece
 Master of Otto van Moerdrecht (active c. 1420–30); Netherlandish illuminator
 Master of Ozieri

P
 Master of the Pähl Altarpiece
 Master of the Pallant Altarpiece
 Master of Panzano
 Master of the Parement
 Master of the Perkins Saint Paul
 Master of the Playing Cards
 Master of the Poldi-Pezzoli Diptychon
 Master of the Prayer Books of around 1500
 Master of the Predella
 Master of the Nicolas Puchner Altarpiece

R
 Master of the Rajhrad Altarpiece
 Master of the Re Alberto Altarpiece
 Master of the Rebel Angels,  Maestro degli Angeli Ribelli of Siena; two paintings are in the musée du Louvre
 Master of the Regular Canons' Altarpiece
 Master of the Rohan Hours

S

 Master of the Saint Augustine Altarpiece
 Master of the Saint Bartholomew Altarpiece
 Master of Saint Cecilia
 Master of Saint Francis
 Master of Saint Giles
 Master of Saint Veronica, Cologne, active to 1420
 Master of Salzburg
 Master of the Saint Lambrecht Votive Altarpiece
 Master of the San Bartolomeo Altarpiece
 Master of the San Giorgio Altarpiece
 Master of San Martino alla Palma
 Master of San Severino
 Master of the Santa Barbara Altarpiece
 Master of Schloss Lichtenstein
 Master of the Schotten Altarpiece
 Master of the Schöppingen Altarpiece
 Master of Signa
 Master of the St. Louis Madonna
 Master of the Staufen Altarpiece
 Master of the Stauffenberg Altarpiece
 Master of the Sterbini Diptych

T
 Master of the Tavole Barberini

 Master of the Tennenbach Altar
 Master of the Terni Dormition
 Master of the Třeboň Altarpiece
 Master of Trognano
 Master of the Tucher Altarpiece

U
 Union Master
 Upper Rhenish Master (also known as Master of the Frankfurt Paradiesgärtlein)

V
 Master of the Vienna Adoration
 Master of the Vienna Chroniques d'Angleterre
 Master of Vignola
 Master of the Virgo inter Virgines
 Master of Vyšší Brod

W
 Master W. B.
 Master W with the Key
 Master of the Washington Coronation
 Master of Wavrin
 Master of the Weibermacht

Z
 Master of Zweder van Culemborg

Artists whose names have since been established
In recent years the names of a variety of artists who were formerly listed as "anonymous" have become known; accordingly scholarly writings and museum labels have been changed to reflect their new identities. Much the most famous of these is the Master of Flémalle (c 1378–1445), painter of the comté de Hainaut, who was established as Robert Campin. Other examples include:
 Jehan Bellegambe, sometimes called the "master of colours".
 Master of 1419 – recognised as Battista di Biagio Sanguigni, having painted and dated in 1419 the central panel for a triptych executed for Santa Maria a Latera, broken up and dispersed
 Master of the Chiostro degli Aranci – recognised as being Giovanni Consalvo, fresco painter at the monastery at Badia Fiorentina
 Barthélemy d'Eyck is the generally accepted as the painter known as the Master of the Aix Annunciation for paintings, and the Master of René of Anjou for illuminated manuscripts; he is also thought by many to be the Master of the Shadows
 The Dombild Master, as Stefan Lochner

See also
 Anonymity
 Anonymous work
 Notname
 List of anonymously published works
 List of works published under a pseudonym

Notes

Sources

  in the introduction to his Le Sujet dans le tableau. Champs Flammarion  (1997) (2006)

Art history